Per Brandtmar (18 July 1918 – 18 December 1992) was a Danish footballer. He played in one match for the Denmark national football team in 1941.

References

External links
 

1918 births
1992 deaths
Danish men's footballers
Denmark international footballers
Footballers from Shanghai
Association football defenders
Boldklubben af 1893 players